"Only You" is a song by British singer Viktoria Modesta. The song was written by Modesta and Nik Hodges and was produced Mr Jones. It was released on 13 May 2012 as the debut single. A music video was directed by Thomas Knights.

Track listings and formats
Digital download
"Only You" – 3:56

Music video 
The video for "Only You" was shot at the 33 Portland Place, directed by Thomas Knights and styled by Karl Willet.

Critical reception 
"Only You" received generally positive reviews from music critics. "The voice and raw sexual chemistry of the most seductive of sirens emerging from London's undercurrent of musical genius." - QX Magazine. "Slick production led pop fronted by an artist already boasting a healthy following." - Music Week.

References

External links
 

2011 songs
2012 singles
British pop songs